Port of Hate is a 1939 American adventure film directed by Harry S. Webb and written by Joseph O'Donnell. The film stars Polly Ann Young, Kenneth Harlan,  Carleton Young, Shia Jung, Monte Blue and Frank LaRue. The film was released on August 22, 1939, by Monogram Pictures.

Plot

Cast          
Polly Ann Young as Jerry Gale
Kenneth Harlan as Bob Randall
Carleton Young as Don Cameron
Shia Jung as Bo Chang
Monte Blue as Hammond
Frank LaRue as Bartley
Ted Adams as Adams
Jimmy Aubrey as Stone
Bruce Dane as Lathrop
Edward Cecil as Wing Hi
John Elliott as Stevens
Reed Howes as Hotel Clerk

References

External links
 

1939 films
1930s English-language films
American adventure films
1939 adventure films
Monogram Pictures films
Films directed by Harry S. Webb
American black-and-white films
1930s American films